Platonovka is a rural locality (a village) in Tambovskoye Rural Settlement, Ternovsky District, Voronezh Oblast, Russia. The population was 51 as of 2010. There are 2 streets.

Geography 
Platonovka is located 46 km west of Ternovka (the district's administrative centre) by road. Tambovka is the nearest rural locality.

References 

Rural localities in Ternovsky District